The 2006 Lexus Cup was a golf event competed by women representing Asia and an International squad representing the rest of the world. Each team was made up of twelve members. The competition took place at the Tanah Merah Country Club in Singapore from 15–17 December 2006. Lexus was the title sponsor while Rolex, DBS, Singapore Airlines and Singapore Sports Council were main sponsors. The Asian team took a dramatic 12½ to 11½ victory in the second annual event, tying the all-time series 1-1.

Teams
As in the similar team events of the Ryder Cup (USA vs. Europe men), Presidents Cup (USA vs. "International" men, i.e. rest of the world excluding Europe), and Solheim Cup (USA vs. Europe women), each team consisted of twelve players.

Asia
Sponsor's Picks
 Grace Park (captain) - Seoul, South Korea
 Sakura Yokomine - Kagoshima, Japan
Rolex Women's World Ranking Qualification
 Se Ri Pak - Daejeon, South Korea
 Hee-Won Han - Seoul, South Korea
 Seon Hwa Lee - Chonnan, South Korea
 Jee Young Lee - Seoul, South Korea
ADT Official Money List Qualification
 Meena Lee - Jeonju, South Korea
 Shi Hyun Ahn - Incheon, South Korea
 Joo Mi Kim - Seoul, South Korea
 Young Kim - Chuncheon, South Korea
Captains Picks
 Candie Kung - Kaohsiung, Taiwan
 Jennifer Rosales - Manila, Philippines

International
Rolex Women's World Rankings
 Annika Sörenstam (captain) - Stockholm, Sweden
 Paula Creamer - Mountain View, California
 Julieta Granada - Asunción, Paraguay
 Natalie Gulbis - Sacramento, California
ADT Official Money List Qualification
 Brittany Lincicome - St. Petersburg, Florida
 Sherri Steinhauer - Madison, Wisconsin
 Stacy Prammanasudh - Enid, Oklahoma
 Angela Stanford - Fort Worth, Texas
Captain's Picks
 Laura Davies - Coventry, England
 Carin Koch - Kungalv, Sweden
Sponsor's Picks
 Morgan Pressel - Tampa, Florida
 Nikki Campbell - Australia

Day one
15 December 2006

Day one saw six foursome matches where each team put two golfers on the course for each match, with the two playing alternate shots.  Asia won two matches, the international team won two with two ending all square, resulting in a three-to-three tie after the first day of play.  The comeback of the day was Jee Young Lee and Meena Lee coming back from four behind at the turn to defeat Natalie Gulbis and Paula Creamer 2 up.

Day two
'16 December 2006The two teams matched up in four ball competition on day two. South Koreans Grace Park and Hee-Won Han won a thrilling match at the last hole against youngsters Morgan Pressel and Julieta Granada of the United States and Paraguay respectively.  Candie Kung of Taiwan and Jennifer Rosales of the Philippines cruised to a relatively easy win over Brittany Lincicome of the United States and Nikki Campbell of Australia.  Koreans Seon Hwa Lee and Se Ri Pak had an even easier victory over Americans Sherri Steinhauer and Angela Stanford to give the Asians the lead going into Sunday's singles.

Day three17 December 2006''

Day three went to the very final match as Seon Hwa Lee broke an 11-all tie on the seventeenth hole against Julieta Granada by halving it to ensure a one-point victory for Team Asia. This happened after two delays due to lightning that cast doubt on whether play would he completed on day three. The International team got off to a good start to the day, resulting in the drama that lasted right until the very end. The second match between Taiwan's Candie Kung and Paula Creamer from the United States went back and forth all the way with three lead changes, the last occurring on the 18th as Creamer took the point, winning the last hole and bringing the Internationals within reach. However, it was not to be as the Asians held on for a dramatic victory.

Golfer records

References

External links
Lexus Cup - official site

Lexus Cup
Golf tournaments in Singapore
Lexus Cup
Lexus Cup